One of the 22 squares of Savannah, Georgia, United States, laid out in 1851 south of Lafayette Square, west of Whitefield Square, and east of Monterey Square, the location long named Calhoun Square has been unnamed since 2022. The oldest buildings on the square, the Adam Short Property and the Alexander Bennett House (both on East Taylor Street), date to 1853. Sometimes called Massie Square, the former Massie Common School House was built in 1855. The Wesley Monumental United Methodist Church, founded in 1868, is located on the western side of the square.

The square had previously been used as a "negro burial ground"; in 1855, the bodies of enslaved residents Emily and Rinah were removed to Laurel Grove Cemetery. In 2004, a skull was found by utility workers outside the Massie Heritage Interpretation Center on the square's southeastern side. This legacy prompted a 2021 movement to rename the square after the Sankofa bird, a Ghanaian symbol expressing the "importance of knowing one's history." Susie King Taylor was considered another candidate for renaming in August 2021. City councilors voted unanimously on November 10, 2022 to remove Calhoun's name from the square; a new name is forthcoming.

Dedication

Constituent buildings

Each building below is in one of the eight blocks around the square composed of four residential "tything" blocks and four civic ("trust") blocks, now known as the Oglethorpe Plan. They are listed with construction years where known.

Northwestern residential/tything block
Mary Demere House, 128 East Taylor Street (1860) – bay windows added 1894
Mary Demere (Estate of) House, 126 East Taylor Street (1872)
Adam Short Property, 118–122 East Taylor Street (1853) – joint-oldest building on the square
108–114 East Taylor Street (1873)
John Kuck House, 106 East Taylor Street (1906)
Alexander Bennett House, 102 East Taylor Street (1853) – joint-oldest building on the square

Northwestern trust/civic block
Sara Clark House, 421 Abercorn Street (1859) – additional level added in 1894

Southwestern trust/civic block
Wesley Monumental United Methodist Church, 429 Abercorn Street (1875)

Southwestern residential/tything block
John B. Berry House, 127 East Gordon Street (1856)
Adolphus Gomm House, 115 East Gordon Street (1869)
Charles Hutchins House, 113 East Gordon Street (1868/1897)
John Mingledorff Property, 439 Abercorn Street (1856)

Northeastern residential/tything block
William Rogers House, 202 East Taylor Street (1859)
George Ash Row House (1), 206–210 East Taylor Street (1855)
Andrew Hanley House, 214 East Taylor Street (1883)
George Ash & Francis Grimball Duplex, 216–218 East Taylor Street (1854)
George Ash Row House (2), 220–224 East Taylor Street (1869)

Northeastern trust/civic block
Easton Yonge House, 426 Abercorn Street (1855) – by George Ash; side porch added 1909

Southeastern trust/civic block
430–432 Abercorn Street (1868)
Edward Purse Duplex, 220–222 East Gordon Street (1856)

Southeastern residential/tything block
Massie Common School House, 201–213 East Gordon Street (1855)
John Guerrard Row House, 215–229 East Gordon Street (1872)
Lengre Building, 233 East Gordon Street (1923)
Flora Max House, 235 East Gordon Street (1894)
Thomas Davis House, 237 East Gordon Street (1893)

Gallery

References

Squares of Savannah, Georgia
1851 establishments in Georgia (U.S. state)